Cúrame may refer to:

"Cúrame" (Prince Royce song), 2019
"Cúrame" (Rauw Alejandro song), 2021